This is a list of presidents of the United States by other offices (either elected or appointed) held. Every president of the United States except Donald Trump has served as at least one of the following:
 Vice President of the United States
 a member of Congress (either U.S. senator or representative)
 a governor of a state
 a Cabinet secretary
 a general of the United States Army

Federal government

Executive branch

Vice presidents 

13 former vice presidents (R. Johnson, Breckinridge, Morton, Stevenson, Fairbanks, Garner, Wallace, Barkley, Nixon, Humphrey, Mondale, Quayle, and Gore) all made failed runs for the presidency. Nixon, Humphrey, Mondale, and Gore received their party's nomination. Nixon would later be elected in a second run for the presidency.

Cabinet secretaries

Calvin Coolidge (as the vice president) and Herbert Hoover both served in the Cabinet of Warren G. Harding.

Ambassadors

Other federal appointees

Judicial branch

Chief Justice of the United States

Other federal judges

Legislative branch

Senators 

A number of future presidents served together while in the Senate:
Monroe served under Vice President Adams (1790–1794).
Jackson served under Vice President Jefferson (1797–1798). Jackson later served with Van Buren (1823–1825). Van Buren also served with W.H. Harrison (1825–1828) and Tyler (1827–1828). Buchanan also served with Tyler (1834–1836) and later served with Pierce (1837–1842). Both Buchanan and Tyler served under Vice President Van Buren (1833–1837), while Buchanan and Pierce later served under Vice President Tyler (1841).
 B. Harrison briefly served under Vice President Arthur (1881).
 L. Johnson served with both Nixon (1950–1953) and Kennedy (1953–1960). L. Johnson and Kennedy both served under Vice President Nixon (1953–1961).
 Biden served under vice presidents Ford (1973–1974) and Bush (1981–1989) and later served with Obama (2005–2008).

James A. Garfield was elected senator for Ohio in 1880, but he did not take up the office due to being elected President later that year.

Seven former senators (Monroe, Adams, Jackson, W.H. Harrison, Pierce, Buchanan, and B. Harrison) were elected to the presidency without ever serving as the vice president between their departure from the Senate and the beginning of their presidencies.

Members of the House of Representatives 

A number of future and former presidents served in the House together:
Jackson served with Madison (1796–1797).
W.H. Harrison served with Tyler (1816–1819).
Buchanan served with Polk (1825–1831). Polk also served with J. Q. Adams (1831–1839). J. Q. Adams later served with Fillmore (1833–1835; 1837–1843), Pierce (1833–1837), A. Johnson (1843–1848), and Lincoln (1847–1848). A. Johnson and Lincoln would continue to serve alongside each other (1848–1849).
Garfield served with both Hayes (1865–1867) and McKinley (1877–1880).
Nixon served with L. Johnson (1947–1949), Kennedy (1947–1950), and Ford (1949–1950). Ford, who continued to serve alongside Kennedy (1950–1953), later served with G. H. W. Bush (1967–1971).

Continental Congress

State and territorial government

Governors

State legislators
 See below for information about pre-1776 colonial offices held.

Other statewide offices

Municipal government

Presidents who had not previously held elective office

With previous experience in government

With previous experience in the military

Without previous experience in government or the military

Colonial governments

Colonial and confederate legislators

See also
List of former presidents of the United States who ran for office

United States
Other offices held